Zenodosus is a genus of checkered beetles in the family Thanerocleridae. There is at least one described species in Zenodosus, Z. sanguineus.

References

Further reading

 

Thanerocleridae
Articles created by Qbugbot